Aitihya- The Heritage; is a multi-lingual (English, Bengali and Assamese) research journal covering issues on Indology. Indology is the academic study of the history, culture, language, literature, sociology, archaeology, philosophy, anthropology and other subjects of Indian life and customary practices. Through this journal, Aitihya Samstha has tried to create a platform to give opportunities to researchers to uncover the rich wealth of this subcontinent.

The journal is a half-yearly publication being published in March- April and September- October of the year. The role of researchers has been central to the growth, understanding and development of the organisation. Researchers and scholars may contribute their unpublished research papers as per the guidelines of the journal.

References

 The heritage = Aitihya : multi-lingual research journal on Indology
 www.tezu.ernet.in/Library/Downloads/PJ_2016.pdf

Indology journals